Amy Wan Man Cheung is a conceptual artist and has produced large-scale works including photography, durational performances, robotic sculptures, installations, wearables, landscape and architectural design and VR short films. Born and raised in Hong Kong, she received a B.A. in art history and fine art from Goldsmiths College in London and an M.F.A. from the Slade School of Fine Art of the University of London. She was Beck's New Contemporaries in U.K. and UNESCO-Aschberg Laureate awarded by UNESCO's International Fund for the Promotion of Culture, subsequently represented Hong Kong in the 2007 Venice Biennale, received the "Outstanding Young Artist Award" from the Hong Kong Arts Development Council. and the Lee Hysan Foundation Fellowship from the Asian Cultural Council.

Since 1997, she has exhibited in over 40 exhibitions—both locally and abroad. She began her artistic career by blindfolding herself for three days to experience Hong Kong's political handover 72 hours sound & vision. Made in Hong Kong (30/6/1997-2/7/1997). This work emerged through the sociopolitical tension between who had the power to control the audio-visual narrative of how did Hong Kong people "feel' through its historical transition. Cheung documented this media spectacle by inviting 72 individuals, each 'open-their-eyes-and-listen-on-her-behalf' in their own environments for an hour, continuously for 72 hours from the day before the handover until the day after. Cheung aspired to democratise the 'official sentimentality' by celebrating individuals' right to remember for themselves how they truly felt about this event and the new identity. In 2013, Cheung collaborated with psychologist Philip Zimbardo, the creator of the Stanford Prison Experiment on a piece called <imagine.heroes>. They went inside a fMRI scanner to imagine heroes for 4 minutes, Cheung thought about a Chinese hero, while Zimbardo focused on an American hero, then they both imagined a Platonic Hero. Their brains' neurochemical activation were captured and engraved into a triptych and subsequently painted in their own blood. Hankie Bank: Boundaries are of Equal Length, Cheung transformed an under utilised City Bank into an immersive theatre and participatory stock exchange. With this project, Cheung aimed to give a new life to a site that had been abandoned.

Selected exhibitions 

 Frozen dislocated shocket plug-ged away home precise warmth, newcontemporaries, Camden Art Center, London, United Kingdom (1997)
 72 hours sound & vision. Made in Hong Kong (30/6/1997-2/7/1997) Media. Art. Project., Amos Anderson Museum, Helsinki, Finland (1997)
 Basketball, Hiding Behind the Sofa, Perma Art Centre, Gloucester, England (1997)
 Slurps!, Forum Box Gallery, Helsinki, Finland (1999)
 Freelance Gallery Tram, City Festival, Hong Kong (1999)
 Nasubi Gallery Project, Cities on the Move, Museum of Contemporary Art, Helsinki, Finland (1999)
 Misled, Institute of Contemporary Art, London, United Kingdom (1999)
 In awhile the crocodile, Marseille en Juin, France (1999)

Group exhibitions

 Open Studios, International Studio & Curatorial Program, Williamsburg, New York, USA (2011)
 Hong Kong Eye 2012, Saatchi Gallery, London, UK (2012-2013)
 Tale of the Wonderland, Blindspot Gallery, Wong Chuk Hang, Hong Kong (2017)
 Camouflage: Visual Art and Design in Disguise (2012)

References

External links 
Official website
Interview with Amy Cheung (Asia Art Archive)

Living people
Hong Kong artists
Hong Kong women artists
Year of birth missing (living people)